The 1974–75 Vancouver Canucks season was the team's 5th in the NHL. With a realignment of the teams in the NHL, the Canucks left the East Division and joined the newly formed Smythe Division. The Canucks won their first division title under this new alignment, and as a result reached the playoffs for the first time. The Canucks earned a first round bye and played in the quarter-finals against the Montreal Canadiens; the Canucks lost 4 games to 1.

This season also marked the first season in which the Canucks played without a team captain.

Regular season

Final standings

Schedule and results

Awards and records

Trophies and awards
Cyclone Taylor Award (Canucks MVP): Gary Smith
Cyrus H. McLean Trophy (Canucks Leading Scorer): Andre Boudrias
Babe Pratt Trophy (Canucks Outstanding Defenceman): Bob Dailey
Fred J. Hume Award (Canucks Unsung Hero): Garry Monahan
Most Exciting Player Award: Bobby Lalonde

Draft picks
Vancouver's picks at the 1974 NHL amateur draft. The draft was held at the NHL Office in Montreal, Quebec.

See also
1974–75 NHL season

References

Vancouver C
Vanc
Smythe Division champion seasons
Vancouver Canucks seasons